Terry M. Musser (November 15, 1947 – November 1, 2018) was an American politician.

Biography 
Musser was born in Black River Falls, Wisconsin and graduated from Melrose-Mindoro High School. He went to University of Wisconsin–La Crosse from 1973 to 1976. Musser served in the United States Army and was a Vietnam War veteran. He was a farmer and a driver license examiner. Musser served in the Wisconsin State Assembly from 1985 until his retirement in 2009. He was a Republican. Musser died on November 1, 2018, at Gundersen Health System in La Crosse, Wisconsin.

References

External links

1947 births
2018 deaths
People from Black River Falls, Wisconsin
Military personnel from Wisconsin
University of Wisconsin–La Crosse alumni
Farmers from Wisconsin
Republican Party members of the Wisconsin State Assembly
21st-century American politicians